His Best Student (Spanish:Su mejor alumno) is a 1944 Argentine biographical drama film directed by Lucas Demare and starring Enrique Muiño and Ángel Magaña. It was released in Buenos Aires on 22 May 1944. The film won many awards, including the award for best film of the year.

In a survey of the 100 greatest films of Argentine cinema carried out by the Museo del Cine Pablo Ducrós Hicken in 2000, the film reached the 39th position.

Synopsis

The film is an emotional enactment of the life of Domingo Sarmiento, the son of a former president of Argentina and the father of public education in the country, Domingo Faustino Sarmiento (Enrique Muiño). "Dominguito" volunteers to fight in the Paraguayan War, in which he dies.
It is based on Vida de Dominguito, written by his father.

Cast
The cast included:

 Enrique Muiño (Domingo Faustino Sarmiento)
 Ángel Magaña (Dominguito)
 Orestes Caviglia
 Norma Castillo
 Guillermo Battaglia
 María Esther Buschiazzo
 Hugo Pimentel
 Alberto de Mendoza
 Judith Sulián
 Domingo Márquez
 Bernardo Perrone
 René Mugica
 Pedro Fiorito
 Horacio Priani
 Mario Lozano
 César Fiaschi
 Warly Ceriani
 Américo Sanjurjo
 Alberto Terrones
 Pablo Cumo
 Carlos Lagrotta
 Arsenio Perdiguero
 Carmen Giménez

Awards

The Argentine Academy of Cinematography Arts and Sciences gave a number of awards for the film:
Best Picture: Artistas Argentinos Asociados
Best director: Lucas Demare
Best original story Ulyses Petit de Murat and Homero Manzi
Best Actor Enrique Muiño
Best scenography Ralph Pappier
Best cinematographer Bob Roberts
Best sound Ramón Ator
Best editing Carlos Rinaldi

At the 1945 Argentine Film Critics Association Awards the film won Best Film, Best Director, Best Actor (Enrique Muiño), Best Adapted Screenplay (Ulises Petit de Murat, Homero Manzi) and Best Camera Operator (Humberto Peruzzi).

References
Citations

Sources

1944 films
1940s historical drama films
Argentine historical drama films
1940s Spanish-language films
Argentine black-and-white films
Films directed by Lucas Demare
Argentine biographical drama films
1940s biographical drama films
Films set in the 1850s
Films set in the 1860s
Films set in Argentina
Films set in Paraguay
1944 drama films
1940s Argentine films
Epic films